

Sybba (or Sibba) was a medieval Bishop of Elmham.

Sybba was consecrated before 814 and died sometime after 816.

References

External links
 

Bishops of Elmham